Kilcock railway station serves the town of Kilcock in County Kildare, Ireland.

It is a station on the Dublin Connolly to Longford Commuter service and Dublin to Sligo InterCity service. Passengers change at Maynooth to travel to stations on the Dublin to Maynooth and Dublin to M3 Parkway Commuter services.

History

The first station opened on 28 June 1847, and was replaced by a new station on 1 July 1848, which closed to regular passenger traffic on 10 November 1947. The current station, under Shaw Bridge, opened in 1998.

See also
 List of railway stations in Ireland

References

External links
Irish Rail Kilcock Station Website

Railway stations opened in 1847
Railway stations opened in 1850
Railway stations opened in 1998
Kilcock
Iarnród Éireann stations in County Kildare
1847 establishments in Ireland
Railway stations in the Republic of Ireland opened in 1847
Railway stations in the Republic of Ireland opened in 1850